Mayer High School is a high school (serving grades 9 through 12) in Mayer, Arizona. Along with an elementary school, it comprises the Mayer Unified School District. Schools in this district operate on a four-day school week.

Mayer USD includes almost all of Mayer, Cordes Lakes, Spring Valley, and a small portion of Black Canyon City.

References

Public high schools in Arizona
Schools in Yavapai County, Arizona